Monica Stoian (born 25 August 1982) is a female javelin thrower from Romania.

She finished seventh at the 1999 World Youth Championships and won the silver medal at the 2007 Summer Universiade. She also competed at the 2007 World Championships and the 2008 Olympic Games without reaching the final.

At the 2009 World Championships in Berlin, she did make the final and finished third, achieving a personal best of 64.51 metres in her first attempt.

Achievements

References
 

1982 births
Living people
Romanian female javelin throwers
Athletes (track and field) at the 2008 Summer Olympics
Olympic athletes of Romania
Universiade medalists in athletics (track and field)
Universiade silver medalists for Romania
Medalists at the 2007 Summer Universiade